The Paradise Ice Caves (also known as the Paradise Glacier Caves) were a system of interconnected glacier caves located within Mount Rainier's Paradise Glacier in the United States.  These glacier caves were visited and documented at least as early as 1908.  They have a varied natural history, as their size and even existence has changed over time, from a maximum surveyed length of 13.25 kilometers in 1978, to not existing at all during both the 1940s and 1990s due to glacial recession.  In 1978 they were the longest mapped system of glacier caves in the world.

References

External links
 Paradise Ice Caves and Camp Muir
 Paradise Ice Caves Tour, Mt. Rainier, ca. 1957
Caves of Washington (state)
Glaciology of the United States
Mount Rainier National Park
Landforms of Pierce County, Washington